Salvatore Palmucci (born 21 April 1940) is a former Sammarinese cyclist. He competed in the individual road race and team time trial events at the 1960 Summer Olympics.

References

External links
 

1940 births
Living people
Sammarinese male cyclists
Italian male cyclists
Italian people of Sammarinese descent
Olympic cyclists of San Marino
Cyclists at the 1960 Summer Olympics
Cyclists from Rome